Environmental issues in Vietnam are numerous and varied. This is due in part to the effects of the Vietnam War, and also because of Vietnam's rapid industrialization following the economic reforms in 1986 known as Doi Moi, amongst other reasons. Officially, the Ministry of Natural Resources and Environment (MONRE) of the Socialist Republic of Vietnam lists environmental issues to include land, water, geology and minerals, and seas and islands, amongst others.

According to the State of the Environment 2001 published by the government, the main environmental issues in Vietnam are land degradation, forest degradation, loss of biodiversity, water pollution, air pollution and solid waste management. However, the issues which the environmental movement in Vietnam is concerned with sometimes fall outside these official categories. For example, according to a World Bank study in 2007, climate change has become a major concern because Vietnam is expected to be seriously impacted by climate related consequences in the years to come.

As regards the responsibility for the management of environmental issues in Vietnam, under the aforementioned MONRE, the Vietnamese Environment Administration (VEA) was established by the Prime Minister on 30 September 2008. The VEA manages environmental issues in Vietnam at the national level. At the provincial level, the Departments of Natural Resources and the Environment (DONRE) are responsible. 

Environmental protection has generally gained policy and public attention. A large number of environmental regulations have been issued since the country's economic reform in the 1990s. The regulations include the Law on Environmental Protection, first issued in 1993, revised in 2005, 2012, and 2020. Political wishes of international integration and increasing public demand for cleaner environment have been key drivers for Vietnam’s environmental policy. 

The Vietnamese Communist Party (VCP) and Vietnamese party-state are not the only actors playing key roles as far as environmental issues are concerned. The environmental movement, part of Vietnam's civil society, consisting of grassroots organizations and non-governmental organizations (NGOs) such as the Institute of Ecological Economics, is also a significant actor. In this entry, the history of the role which the environmental movement in Vietnam has played in influencing how environmental issues have unfolded and been perceived by the state and by society will be examined.

History
From 1975 onwards, when Vietnam was reunified under VCP leadership, commentators have often claimed that civic life diminished under tight state control. However, the commonplace impression of Vietnam as an ostensibly communist authoritarian state where social and community movements are either rare or do not have much effect on government or policy decisions has been demonstrated not to be the case. Neither is it the case that all instances of resistance or dissent are met monolithically with a uniform strategy of repression by the Vietnamese party-state. For example, Benedict Kerkvliet has documented repeated instances of citizen criticisms of authorities' alleged tolerance when it came to Chinese economic malpractices in bauxite mining activities, which were at least to a limited extent tolerated by the authorities. While Kerkvliet frames the anti-bauxite movement in terms of anti-Chinese sentiments, it can also be framed as indicative of growing socio-political opposition, as Jason Morris-Jung does (see section on "2007 anti-bauxite environment movement" below).

Prior to Doi Moi and the Vietnam War, it is not the case that there was a complete lack of an environmental consciousness in Vietnam. In fact, the history of environmental issues in Vietnam goes as far back as at least the 1950s. For example, environmental issues had surfaced in the context of industrial and economic activities, such as the detrimental environmental effects of highly polluting industries. However, there is little by way of evidence that social movements organized around the cause of the environment were specifically a feature of Vietnamese civic life at the time. Part of the reason for the absence of a concerted, mobilized environmental movement in the past could be due to the extent of control wielded by the VCP over the country's civil sphere. However, apart from claims which rely on the power of the party-state to explain the lack of an environmental movement in Vietnam in the past, it has also been noted that right up until the early 1990s, a significant proportion of the national population still continued to earn less income than the poverty threshold of US$1.90 per day, and in light of these circumstances, it was understandable that environmental issues did not feature highly on Vietnamese people's list of priorities.

Much ink has been spilt in attempting to understand the impact of the Second Indochina War, commonly referred to as the Vietnam War, on the historical progression of environmental issues in Vietnam, especially after the War ended in 1975. Many of these commentaries have dwelt on the destructive effects of military action on Vietnam's landscape and environment, with a focus on American military action. For instance, it has been well researched that between 1961 and 1971, U.S military forces dispersed more than 19 million gallons of herbicidal agents over the Republic of Vietnam, including more than 12 million gallons of the dioxin-contaminant commonly known as Agent Orange. As large as these numbers appear to be, the environmental issues which their contaminative elements have given rise to, although significant, have been shown to have limited subsequent effects, such as consequences for planting crops on available arable land, based on World Bank data up to 2009.

The focus of commentary on American military action is probably attributable to two reasons. First, the scale of American operations, by virtue of their relative economic and military power, were carried out at a completely different order of magnitude from that of the North Vietnamese. Second, primary sources, such as photographic and documentary archival records which recorded the American side of events, are also more readily available. That being said, other scholars have sought to expand the understanding of the environmental issues which arose as consequences of the War. For example, David Biggs highlights in his environmental history of Central Vietnam that the effect of the War left on the landscape (what he calls "footprints") were not exclusively destructive, but also had constructive or creative dimensions as well.

What sort of environmental movement, if any, emerged to address the environmental damage precipitated by the War? For the Vietnam War's environmental issues, unlike other environmental issues which will be elaborated upon subsequently, efforts such as decontamination were driven primarily by governmental and civic movements originating primarily in the United States, such as USAID and the Ford Foundation. Even in the present day, after fifty years of clean up have elapsed, it is foreign international bodies like the World Health Organization, rather than domestic ones, which continue to take the lead in the environmental movement to rectify the scars of military history on Vietnam's natural landscape.

Doi Moi, civil society and environmental movements
As regards the question of when the environmental movement in Vietnam really took off, historians point to various start dates, including the 1950s as previously mentioned in the case of O'Rourke, all the way up until the early 1990s, as in the case of Kerkvliet's observations about citizen discontent being voiced out by environmental activists. However, there is broad consensus that environmental issues began featuring more prominently in Vietnam's civic sphere following the Doi Moi reforms which were initiated from 1986 onwards by a new generation of more progressive Vietnamese political leaders. Empirically, records of environmental movement activities such as protests seeking to address environmental issues show that these have mostly taken place with greater frequency starting from after major examples (for instance, the movements or activism relating to the preservation of Hanoi’s Reunification Park, as recounted by Andrew Wells-Dang, and that relating to the bauxite controversy as recounted by Jason Morris-Jung) had created greater overall awareness and concern, which Stephan Ortmann argues is from around 2010 onwards, where there have been at least 13 major environmental protests involving hundreds, if not thousands, of protesters.

At one level, new types of environmental issues were created as a byproduct of new and increased economic activities, given that the primary objective of reforms was to boost business growth in an attempt to eradicate poverty. For example, while business and agricultural reforms led to the creation of more than 30,000 new private businesses and reduced the percentage of the Vietnamese population living under the poverty line from about 50 percent to 29 percent, an environmental consequence of this growth reported in a 2003 publication jointly produced by MONRE, the Ministry of Agriculture and Rural Development and the Ministry of Fisheries was the conflict created between demands for land development and planning on the one hand, and area conservation plans on the other.

How did the Doi Moi reforms, which were primarily economic in nature, relate to the 11 growth of civil society, including the environmental movement, in Vietnam? This has been a matter of some historiographical debate, with tensions pulling in multiple directions. By and large, the party-state has hinted at the importance of local participation at the grassroots level in social issues including the environment. That being said, obstacles to active involvement in the environmental movement and civil society continued to persist, some of which were had always been present in Vietnam, while others, ironically, were consequences of economic reforms. For instance, some historians stressed the persistence of Leninist structure which made it difficult for bottom-up initiatives to gain any real traction, while also highlighting the resistance of strong economic interest groups whose businesses would not have benefited from tighter environmental controls and regulations, were these to come into reality as a product of greater awareness of environmental issues and successful activism15. The role of international NGOs and international donors of foreign aid, formally known as official development assistance or ODA, in applying pressure to involve more people and societal actors in the environmental movement has also been emphasized.

Whether or not the environmental movement can be considered a civil society actor in its own right is unclear. This is because it has so far had mixed successes and failures in bringing about changes to positively address environmental issues in Vietnam. While a more detailed discussion of the bauxite controversy will proceed in the following section, it suffices to note here that the case of the anti-bauxite movement could be used to demonstrate the limits of bottom-up pressures from environmental activists. Nevertheless, there have been some successes, such as the involvement of the environmental movement in pushing for the Law on Environmental Protection which came into effect on 2015, expanding the space that civil society could occupy by legitimating the involvement of community-based organizations in environmental issues. Further on, the case of the environmental movement which pursued as its goal the preservation of the Reunification Park in Hanoi could show that civil society networks have developed in the Vietnamese context.

Not everyone would agree that the Law on Environmental Protection was as significant for the environmental movement or for addressing environmental issues in Vietnam as it has been made out to be. A more cynical perspective claims that compliance with the new legislation merely took the form of nominal environmental divisions by economic agencies such as the Ministry of Construction18. Disparities and tensions also existed at different levels of government, such as between central and provincial authorities. Nevertheless, nominal or otherwise, there exists evidence, at least to a limited extent, of instances in Vietnam where environmental regulations, and enforcement of those regulations, were motivated because of community complaints or demands. Historians refer to this phenomenon as community-driven regulation, with a key example being the actions taken by the provincial Departments of Science, Technology and Environment (DOSTEs) in the 1990s. The way that community pressures or civic opposition came to bear upon authorities’ decisions and actions continued into the 2000s and 2010s. Beyond just environmental issues, however, the environmental movement has come to be understood as playing a contributory role to wider social activism in the context of Vietnam's civil society. Environmental movement groups such as Green Group Hanoi frame their campaigns by situating conservation and sustainability issues within the language of responsible and accountable government. In agitating for good governance, the movement goes beyond environmental issues into a new space of political contestation.

2007 anti-bauxite environmental movement 
As mentioned earlier, the anti-bauxite environmental movement in Vietnam in 2007 has been understood in various ways, including as an example of Vietnamese people speaking out about an environmental issue they care about in a socialist authoritarian context, and an instance where bottom-up community pressures had limited success in addressing the status quo. Another way it has been made sense of is as a new mode of political contestation and compromise between the environmental movement and the party-state. Although historians generally agree that the movement may not have had much success in stopping bauxite mining in the Central Highlands, it did manage to resist the attempted repressions of public discourse about the mining projects.

Moreover, the activities of the anti-bauxite environmental movement demonstrated the digitalization of social action, which has come to characterize how a wide range of other priority issues in contemporary Vietnamese civil society are being championed. Specifically, the use of online petitions during the bauxite controversy has become a recurring mode of activism. The significance of this environmental issue is plainly evident from Morris-Jung’s description of a post-bauxite politics in Vietnam.

2016 Vietnam marine environment disaster 

In April 2016, another significant environmental issue in Vietnam surfaced due to the illegal discharging of toxic industrial waste into the ocean near the coast of Central Vietnam by a steep plant (Formosa Ha Tinh Steel) owned by a Taiwanese corporation (Formosa Plastics), which affected Hà Tĩnh, Quảng Bình, Quảng Trị and Thừa Thiên–Huế provinces. Fish carcasses were reported to have washed up on the beaches of Hà Tĩnh province from at least 6 April 2016. Later, a large number of dead fish were found on the coast of Hà Tĩnh and three other provinces (Quảng Bình, Quảng Trị and Thừa Thiên–Huế) until 18 April 2016.

The resultant water pollution contributed to the destruction of marine life and affected the lives of Vietnamese people whose livelihoods depended on the health of the ecosystem. Although Formosa denied being responsible, protests in April and May 2016 by ordinary Vietnamese citizens, not all of whom were necessarily directly or personally affected by the disaster, were successful in pressuring authorities to levy penalties after the company was found to be responsible on June 30, 2016, and compensations were disbursed to affected parties accordingly.

Other environmental issues in Vietnam 
Over the course of the history of the environmental movement in Vietnam, different types of issues have come to the fore at one time or another:

 Conservation of Hang Sơn Đoòng cave: Similar to the preservation of Hanoi's Reunification Park mentioned earlier, the environmental movement in Vietnam has come out to oppose the proposed plans for building a cable car, at a cost of between $112 and $211 million, through the cave, located in Phong Nha-Kẻ Bàng National Park, and considered the world's largest cave (by volume).
 Air pollution: Due to increased vehicular transportation, industrial activities, solid fuel burning and poor urban planning, air pollution, especially when measured by the concentration of PM2.5 particles in the air, is becoming an environmental issue of significance in big cities such as Hanoi and Ho Chi Minh City, which are now among the top polluted cites in South East Asia. One possible way to address this environmental issue is through the development of renewable energy solutions such as solar and wind power which have the potential to reduce air pollution. Furthermore, citizens' demands for action on air pollution are an important factor in the government's choice to reduce emissions.
 Accessibility to clean water. Vietnamese citizens generally have high levels of freshwater accessibility, although there is some variability between larger and smaller cities, and between cities and rural areas. Tap water is a readily available water supply in large cities such as Ho Chi Minh City and Hanoi. However, in rural areas, hand-dug wells remain the most important source of water as 39%-44% still rely on it. Only 10% of the rural population is supplied with piped water. Like air pollution, water pollution levels are also increasing due to increased industrial activity, especially in the Mekong Delta. In a region where most people depend on the surface water of the river, this environmental issue has had human health consequences, such as high rates of diarrhea. Overall in Vietnam, the number of reported diarrhea diseases was 296000 in total in 2009. Other examples of waterborne diseases in Vietnam include cholera, typhoid fever, dysentery, and hepatitis A. Reported cases of cholera is still significantly high. Caused by drinking water contaminated by bacterium, the number of reported cholera is well above 500, reaching 1900 in 2007, and 600 in 2010. However, the fatality rate of cholera has been close to 0% since 1999.
 Wetlands: Wetlands in Vietnam, along with their biodiversity, have decreased significantly. In the case of mangrove forest areas in the Mekong Delta, these have decreased by 80 per cent between 1943 and 2000. Key causes of wetland degradation include ad hoc dyke construction. To address this environmental issue, development planning ought to take into consideration the costs, benefits and impacts on wetlands. For example, revisions to water management governance have contributed to recent improvements in the wetland degradation situation.
 Forests: The integrity of Vietnam's forest landscape is relatively low; on the 2018 Forest Landscape Integrity Index, Vietnman ranked 104th globally out of 172 countries, with a mean score of 5.35/10.
 Environmental issues relating to free trade: Vietnam is committed to multilateral environmental agreements, including those on climate change and biodiversity, including the EU-Vietnam Free Trade Agreement and Investment Protection Agreement. To comply with these commitments, Vietnam would need strengthen regulations and enforcement on the illegal wildlife trade, as well as illegal, unregulated and unreported fishing practices, to enable Vietnam to fully reap the "benefits" from "free" trade.

See also
 Deforestation in Vietnam
 Environmental impact of coffee production in Vietnam
 Environmental impact of war
 Operation Ranch Hand
 2016 Vietnam marine environment disaster

References

Issues
Vietnam